was a Japanese late Edo period samurai and founder of the Tōkyūjutsu divination and self-improvement method. He lived in Edo (now Tokyo). His real name was Yokoyama Okitaka, and he was also known as Sannosuke, Shunkisai, Kiosanjin,  and other pen names.

References 

People of Edo-period Japan
1780 births
1854 deaths